The Church of St. John the Baptist, Hoxton, usually known as St. John's Hoxton, is an English urban Anglican parish church in the Hoxton area of Shoreditch, within the London Borough of Hackney. 
 
Nearby is Silicon Roundabout, and also Aske Gardens, named after the parish's major benefactor, City alderman and haberdasher Robert Aske.

Architecture

Completed in 1826, St. John's is a Georgian church in the Classical style, and the only one built to the design of Francis Edwards, Sir John Soane's foremost pupil. The building is a large example of a Commissioners' church, with its original floor plan intact, as well as notable galleries and décor, including a painted ceiling. This was executed in the early 20th century by the architect Joseph Arthur Reeve.

Pipe organ

Built and installed in 1915 by the firm of Thomas Sidwell Jones, the organ is situated in the choir gallery and retains its original late Georgian wooden case with an elaborate façade displaying the arms of King William IV.

Last restored in 1934 by Henry Speechly & Son, St John's organ is voiced with the following stops:

Parish history

Dedicated to St. John the Baptist, its name preserves the memory of a local priory dissolved by King Henry VIII.

In Victorian London the parish's work was recognised by social campaigners, such as the philanthropist Charles Booth, for its welfare work in a deteriorating inner-city environment. To give opportunities to the "local poor", the first vicar founded what became London's largest savings bank and St John's National Schools which still thrive. Many members of the church became missionaries in Africa and Asia, among them the first Bishop of Chota Nagpur, the Rt Revd Jabez Cornelius Whiteley, whose father was Chaplain to the Haberdashers' Aske's Hospital School formerly located in Pitfield Street.

Robert Aske's legacy still benefits the parish and associated primary school, while Haberdasher Street like Aske Gardens,  remain in the memory of his original generosity.

One of the 18th-century residents of Hoxton Square, the Revd John Newton, composed the popular hymn "Amazing Grace". Mary Wollstonecraft (1759–97), the writer and philosopher, was born in Hoxton. John Mander, an organ builder, lived at Hoxton and one of his sons, Noel Mander, founded Mander Organs.

The maternal great-great-great-grandfather of Kate Middleton (now the Duchess of Cambridge), John Goldsmith, was married to Esther Jones at St John's Church in 1850.

The present vicar is the Revd Graham Hunter.

See also

 Geffrye Museum
 List of churches in the Diocese of London

References

External links

 St. John's Hoxton official website
 www.haberdashers.co.uk
 www.npor.org.uk
 www.ashrare.com/hoxton_prints
 www.londongardensonline.org.uk

Notes 
 www.hackney.gov.uk/hackney-museum
 Air Cadets, Squadron 444: ATC HQ, Crondall Place, Crondall St, Hoxton N1
 East of London Family History Society
 www.english-walks.com: walk on the trail of street art Hoxton to Shoreditch

External links

Buildings and structures in the London Borough of Hackney
Church of England church buildings in the London Borough of Hackney
Parks and open spaces in the London Borough of Hackney
Churches completed in 1826
1826 establishments in England
19th-century Church of England church buildings
Commissioners' church buildings
Diocese of London
Grade II* listed buildings in the London Borough of Hackney
Grade II* listed churches in London
Georgian architecture in London
Greek Revival church buildings in the United Kingdom
Neoclassical architecture in London
Regency London
Holy Trinity Brompton plants
Regency architecture in London
Hoxton
Neoclassical church buildings in England